Altice USA, Inc., commonly known as Altice, is an American cable television provider with headquarters in New York City.  It delivers pay television, Internet access, telephone services, and original television content to approximately 4.9 million residential and business customers in 21 states.

As a multiple-systems operator, the company operates the Optimum brand. The company also provides international news through the February 2017 U.S. launch of i24NEWS and local news through News 12 Networks. It formerly operated the Suddenlink brand.

With its combined brands, Altice USA is the fourth-largest cable provider in the U.S., having customers residing in the New York City tri-state area, as well as several midwestern and southern states.

In November 2016, Altice USA announced a five-year plan for fiber-to-the-home to build a network capable of delivering 10 Gbit/s broadband speed. In August 2017, the company stated it was on track to reach one million homes by the end of 2018.

In June 2017, Altice USA raised US$2.2 billion in an initial public stock offering.

Altice USA is based at One Court Square in Long Island City, Queens with its operational center located at Cablevision's former headquarters in Bethpage, New York.

In April 2022, Altice USA announced it would be rebranding Suddenlink under the Optimum name.

Products and services
 Optimum Online, a DOCSIS Internet service that offers speeds up to 940 Mbit/s. As of April 2020, a Fiber-to-the home service is available to more than half of its service footprint.
 Subscribers also get access to Optimum Wi-Fi hotspots that are located within the Altice's service area. Additionally, they may also connect to hotspots provided by Charter Spectrum, Comcast, and Cox nationwide.
 Optimum Voice, a Voice over IP (VoIP) telephone service
 Optimum TV, a digital cable service
 Altice Mobile, a wireless network offering unlimited text, talk, and data over a 4G LTE nationwide network;

Other properties
 Altice Business (Built of the former Lightpath, Optimum Business, and Suddenlink Business organizations), an internet, telephone, and television service for businesses. Altice Business is currently available in 21 state and serves more than 375,000 businesses.
News 12 Networks, a group of cable networks that provide news, weather, traffic and sports to cable subscribers in the New York/New Jersey/Connecticut tri-state area through seven individual 24-hour local news channels and five traffic and weather channels.
 News 12 Varsity, A high school sports network dedicated to providing live games of local varsity games. 
 Audience Partners, a provider of audience-based digital advertising solutions, which Altice USA acquired in March 2017.
 Cheddar, a live-streaming financial news network, which was acquired in 2019.

History
On May 20, 2015, Netherlands-based Altice NV announced that it would enter the U.S. cable market by purchasing Suddenlink Communications, the country's 7th-largest cable provider, for $9.1 billion.  The acquisition closed on December 21, 2015.

On September 17, 2015, Altice NV announced its intention to acquire Cablevision from the Dolan family and other public shareholders for $17.7 billion. The deal was approved by the FCC on May 3, 2016 and after approval from various regional regulators such as New Jersey's Board of Public Utilities and the New York Public Service Commission, closed on June 21, 2016. Under the terms of the deal, Altice paid $34.90 in cash for each share in Cablevision and a 22% premium to the company's stock price; Altice also assumed Cablevision's debt. Prior to this, Altice had already acquired St. Louis-based Suddenlink Communications, and both companies became subsidiaries of Altice USA.

In May 2017, Altice USA announced its intention to rebrand its Suddenlink and Cablevision properties under the Altice name by the end of the second quarter of 2018.

In June 2017, Altice USA went public, raising $2.2 billion in its initial public offering.

On January 8, 2018, Altice NV announced that it will spin-off Altice USA into a separate company. Patrick Drahi will maintain control of both companies, although they will be led by separate management teams.

On April 30, 2019, it was announced Altice USA was buying Cheddar for $200 million in cash.

On February 14, 2020, Altice USA announced that it has bought Service Electric Broadband Cable in New Jersey. The deal closed in July.

On March 1, 2021, Altice USA announced that it would acquire Morris Broadband in North Carolina for $310 million which was later closed on April 6, 2021. Altice later announced that Morris Broadband would be rebranded into the Optimum name.

Markets 
The company provides service in 22 states:

Carriage disputes

AMC Networks dispute
Altice engaged in a carriage dispute with the Dolan family (the former owners of Cablevision). Altice's contract to carry AMC Networks group of channels was to expire on December 31, 2016. On December 28 the two sides reached an agreement, three days before their contract with AMC expired.

The Walt Disney Company dispute
Altice engaged in a dispute with The Walt Disney Company; the contract to carry the company's channels was set to expire on October 1, 2017.

On October 1, 2017, Disney and Altice reached a last-minute agreement to continue carrying the company's channels; this narrowly averted what would have been a blackout of ABC-owned stations WABC-TV and WPVI-TV, along with the ESPN family of networks and various other channels. As part of the agreement, ESPN Classic was removed from the Altice lineup.

Starz dispute
On January 1, 2018, Altice dropped Starz, Starz Encore, and all of their channels from its channel lineup. The dispute came after the companies were unable to reach an agreement. The dispute ended on February 13, 2018 after both companies reached a new multi-year agreement.

21st Century Fox dispute
On September 22, 2018, 21st Century Fox announced that all of its entertainment and sports channels, including Fox owned-and-operated station WNYW and MyNetworkTV O&O WWOR-TV, would be removed from Altice on October 1 if a new retransmission agreement was not reached by that date.

See also
 List of multiple-system operators
 List of United States telephone companies

References

External links
 
 

 
Companies based in Nassau County, New York
Economy of the Northeastern United States
Cable television companies of the United States
Corporate spin-offs
Companies listed on the New York Stock Exchange
American companies established in 2016
Telecommunications companies established in 2016
2017 initial public offerings